The Freeborn T. Lasater House is a historic house at 494 Arkansas Highway 197 in New Blaine, Arkansas.  It is a single-story masonry structure, built out of uncoursed fieldstone, with petrified wood and Native American stone tools, discovered on the property, embedded at various points.  It was built over a six-year period by Freeborn Lasater and his family, beginning in 1928, and is the small communities best example of Craftsman architecture.

The house was listed on the National Register of Historic Places in 2002.

See also
National Register of Historic Places listings in Logan County, Arkansas

References

Houses on the National Register of Historic Places in Arkansas
National Register of Historic Places in Logan County, Arkansas
Houses completed in 1928
Houses in Logan County, Arkansas